Woodend Beach is a small rural community in the Waimakariri District, New Zealand.

Demographics
It is part of the wider Pegasus Bay statistical area.

Woodend Beach had a population of 264 at the 2018 New Zealand census, an increase of 21 people (8.6%) since the 2013 census, and an increase of 60 people (29.4%) since the 2006 census. There were 108 households. There were 147 males and 120 females, giving a sex ratio of 1.23 males per female. The median age was 41.4 years (compared with 37.4 years nationally), with 54 people (20.5%) aged under 15 years, 30 (11.4%) aged 15 to 29, 141 (53.4%) aged 30 to 64, and 39 (14.8%) aged 65 or older.

Ethnicities were 95.5% European/Pākehā, 9.1% Māori, and 3.4% Asian (totals add to more than 100% since people could identify with multiple ethnicities).

Although some people objected to giving their religion, 53.4% had no religion, 34.1% were Christian and 5.7% had other religions.

Of those at least 15 years old, 27 (12.9%) people had a bachelor or higher degree, and 48 (22.9%) people had no formal qualifications. The median income was $29,700, compared with $31,800 nationally. The employment status of those at least 15 was that 96 (45.7%) people were employed full-time, 36 (17.1%) were part-time, and 12 (5.7%) were unemployed.

References

Waimakariri District
Populated places in Canterbury, New Zealand